, born 21 January 1986) is a Brazilian-born Japanese beach soccer player who plays as a defender.

He is the captain and briefly the head coach of the Japanese national team, having gained Japanese citizenship in 2012. He won the Silver and Golden Balls at FIFA World Cups and is known as one of the best defenders in beach soccer history. He is particularly known for his towering presence and powerful long-range free kicks. 

In 2019, he became the first Japanese player to score over 100 international goals.

Biography

Early life
Ozu was born in Rio de Janeiro, Brazil and began playing beach soccer aged six on the beaches of Copacabana, growing up playing with future members of the Brazilian national team including Rafinha, Bokinha and Mauricinho. Aged 10, Ozu's beach soccer school accepted an invite to play an exhibition match before a Brazil match at Copacabana arena which was watched by 5,000 people. As a child, Ozu played association football including joining Vasco da Gama aged 14 and was scouted on numerous occasions but living minutes from the beach and watching beach soccer regularly on TV was the inspiration for Ozu to decide to pursue becoming a beach soccer professional, aged 16. In 2004, at 18, he signed his first beach soccer contract, with São Paulo.

Becoming Japanese
Ozu has stated that he never had the ambition to play for the Brazilian national team. Instead, his dream was to live abroad, learn about a new culture and compete as a beach soccer player there.

In 2006, he moved to Germany and briefly played there. In 2007, aged 21, he accepted an offer to play for Lequios in Okinawa, Japan. Despite having no experience with Japanese culture, he immediately adapted to the way of life and, thanks to his experience of the cordiality of the Japanese people, fell in love with the country. In 2009, Lequios relocated from Okinawa to Tokyo and Ozu followed suit. There, he met with fellow Brazilian and naturalised Japanese, Ruy Ramos, then coach of the Japanese national team. In spite of offers to play for Brazil, Ozu expressed to Ramos his desire to also gain Japanese citizenship so that he could play for Japan, the country of his "heart". Ramos decided to help him. Ozu subsequently learnt to be fluent in the Japanese language and after five mandatory years of living in Japan, he acquired citizenship on 12 December 2012 and dropped the name of Osmar for Ozu; he was immediately called up to the Japanese national team.

Career as Japanese international
At his first international tournament, the 2013 AFC Beach Soccer Championship, he was crowned best player and later in the year led his new country as captain to the quarter-finals of the 2013 FIFA Beach Soccer World Cup, his first World Cup, in which he won the Silver Ball (second best player) award. The inaugural Beach Soccer Stars awards in 2014 saw Ozu named as part of the best team of the year, an accomplishment he has achieved again every since bar one as of 2019, cementing his position as one of the world's best players.

In 2015, Ozu was once again named best player at the AFC Championship and was also joint top scorer. He also joined the FC Barcelona team at that year's Mundialito de Clubes which the Spanish team won and opened his own institution for children, the "Copacabana Beach Soccer School", in Okinawa. 2016 saw Ozu branch further into playing for European clubs; he became the second Japanese to play in the Italian National League, for Viareggio, winning Europe's top club prize, the Euro Winners Cup, with the Tuscan side that season. He has since had spells at FC City and Lokomotiv Moscow of Russia, Sporting CP of Portugal and Falfala Kfar Qassem of Israel. In 2017, Ozu joined the first J-League club to establish a beach soccer branch, Tokyo Verdy, who he would go on to win multiple JFA League titles with. He also became an ambassador of the JFA's 'Teacher of Dreams' project, touring schools across Japan, explaining to children how he has overcome problems in his life to achieve the successes in his field. The AFC described Ozu's performance as "outstanding" as he again won the best player and top scorer awards of the AFC Championship, this time the 2019 edition, which Japan won for the first time under his leadership. 2019 continued to mark major international landmarks for Ozu as he reached a century of goals scored in a 7–2 win over Uruguay at the World Beach Games and also earned his 100th cap at the Intercontinental Cup a month later. Despite crucially missing his attempt in the penalty shootout against Portugal in the semi-final, Ozu ultimately inspired Japan to a positive 2019 World Cup performance of fourth place, their joint best ever finish at the World Cup matching 2005, and he also won the prestigious Golden Ball (best player) award at the tournament.

In July 2020, Ozu was named as the new head coach of the Japanese national team, making him a player-manager.

Statistics

Country

Club

Honours
The following is a selection, not an exhaustive list, of the major international honours Ozu has achieved:

Team
FIFA Beach Soccer World Cup:
Fourth place (1): 2019
Runners Up (1): 2021

AFC Beach Soccer Championship: 
Champion (1): 2019
Runner-up (2): 2013, 2015

Asian Beach Games: 
Gold medal (1): 2016
Silver medal (1): 2014

Euro Winners Cup (1): 2016

Euro Winners Challenge: Runner-up 2018

Mundialito de Clubes (2): 2015, 2017

Individual
FIFA Beach Soccer World Cup
Golden Ball: 2019
Silver Ball: 2013

Beach Soccer Stars
World dream team: 2014, 2015, 2016, 2018, 2019

AFC Beach Soccer Championship
Best player: 2013, 2015, 2019
Top scorer: 2015, 2019

Mundialito de Clubes
Best player: 2015

References

External links
Moreira Ozu, profile at Beach Soccer Worldwide
Moreira Ozu, profile at Japan Football Association (in Japanese)
Ozu Moreira, profile at Beach Soccer Russia (in Russian)
Ozu Moreira, profile at ZeroZero.pt (in Portuguese)

1986 births
Living people
Japanese footballers
Japanese beach soccer players
Association football defenders
Brazilian emigrants to Japan
Naturalized citizens of Japan